Peter Leslie (born 24 February 1947) is an Australian cricketer. He played seven first-class matches for New South Wales between 1965/66 and 1968/69.

See also
 List of New South Wales representative cricketers

References

External links
 

1947 births
Living people
Australian cricketers
New South Wales cricketers
Cricketers from Sydney